Qods Azad Cooperative ( – Kārgāh Sherkat-e Qods Āzād) is a village in Howmeh Rural District, in the Central District of Larestan County, Fars Province, Iran. At the 2006 census, its population was 28, in 5 families.

References 

Populated places in Larestan County